ATP synthase delta subunit  is a subunit of bacterial and chloroplast F-ATPase/synthase. It is known as OSCP (oligomycin sensitivity conferral protein) in mitochondrial ATPase (note that in mitochondria there is a different delta subunit, ATP synthase delta/epsilon subunit).

The OSCP/delta subunit appears to be part of the peripheral stalk that holds the F1 complex alpha3beta3 catalytic core stationary against the torque of the rotating central stalk, and links subunit A of the FO complex with the F1 complex. In mitochondria, the peripheral stalk consists of OSCP, as well as FO components F6, B and D. In bacteria and chloroplasts the peripheral stalks have different subunit compositions: delta and two copies of FO component B (bacteria), or delta and FO components B and B' (chloroplasts).

F-ATPases lacking this subunit generally transport sodium instead of protons. They are proposed to be called N-ATPases, since they seem to form a distinct group that is further apart from usual F-ATPases than A-ATPases are from V-ATPases.

Human delta subunit of ATP synthase is coded by gene ATP5O.

References

Further reading

Protein domains
Protein families
Membrane proteins